10 Years of Hits is the first compilation album released by Boyzone frontman, Ronan Keating. The album was released on 11 October 2004, and included all of Keating's singles to date, plus three new singles, two previously unreleased tracks, and the B-side "This Is Your Song". The album peaked at number one on the UK Albums Chart, becoming the third out of four of Keating's albums to do so. In 2010, an anniversary edition of the album was issued in Australia containing further singles that were released after the original release of the album and was certified 4× Platinum in Australia in 2016.

Track listing
 "When You Say Nothing at All" (featuring Paulina Rubio)  – 4:17 Re-recorded version
 "Life Is a Rollercoaster" – 3:54 from Ronan
 "The Way You Make Me Feel" (featuring Bryan Adams) (Single Mix)  – 3:38 from Ronan
 "Lovin' Each Day" – 3:32 from Ronan
 "If Tomorrow Never Comes" – 3:34 from Destination
 "I Love It When We Do" – 3:52 from Destination
 "We've Got Tonight" (featuring Lulu)  – 3:37 from Destination
 "The Long Goodbye (Single Version)" – 4:18 from Destination
 "Lost for Words" – 3:46 from Turn It On
 "She Believes (In Me)" (Single Version)  – 4:06 from Turn It On
 "Last Thing on My Mind" (featuring LeAnn Rimes) (Single Version)  – 3:57 from Turn It On
 "Father and Son" (featuring Yusuf) – 3:20 Previously unreleased
 "Words"  – 3:51 Previously unreleased
 "Baby Can I Hold You" – 3:09 Previously unreleased
 "I Hope You Dance" – 3:34 Previously unreleased
 "Somebody Else" – 4:05 Previously unreleased
 "This Is Your Song (2003 Version)" – 3:59

 Bonus Track for Brazil
 "When You Say Nothing at All" (featuring Deborah Blando)  – 4:29 Re-recorded version

 Australian Anniversary Edition
 "When You Say Nothing at All" – 4:17
 "Life Is a Rollercoaster" – 3:54
 "The Way You Make Me Feel" – 3:38
 "Lovin' Each Day" – 3:32
 "If Tomorrow Never Comes" – 3:34
 "I Love It When We Do" – 3:52
 "We've Got Tonight" (featuring Lulu)  – 3:37
 "The Long Goodbye" – 4:18
 "Lost for Words" – 3:46
 "She Believes (In Me)" – 4:06
 "Last Thing on My Mind" (featuring LeAnn Rimes) – 3:57
 "I Hope You Dance" – 3:34
 "Father and Son" (featuring Yusuf) – 3:20
 "Baby Can I Hold You" – 3:09
 "All Over Again" (featuring Kate Rusby) – 3:42
 "Iris" – 4:08
 "This I Promise You" – 3:50
 "Time After Time" – 3:50
 "This Is Your Song" – 3:59
 "Stay" – 3:13
 "It's Only Christmas" (featuring Kate Ceberano) – 3:26
 "Believe Again" (featuring Paulini) – 3:39

Charts

Weekly charts

Year-end charts

Certifications and sales

References

2004 greatest hits albums
Ronan Keating compilation albums
Polydor Records compilation albums